KCGS (960 AM) is a radio station serving the Marshall, Arkansas, area with a Christian format. The station was under the ownership of Southland Broadcasting Corporation from 2002 to 2008. In late 2008, the station was sold to the Word and Faith Christian Church Inc. for $300,000. Effective December 21, 2012, the station was sold to Steven & Alice Kiefer, through licensee Kiefer Retirement Services, Inc. Steve Kiefer has changed the format to reflect a Christian News/Talk formula. Steve hosts a live show each weekday at 8 am (CST) covering current news and issues from a Biblical perspective.

On April 26, 2017, KCGS filed an application with the Federal Communications Commission to transfer the license to Ichthus Outreach Ministries, LLC for $100. The sale was completed on July 10, 2017.

References

External links
KCGS AM 960 - Official Website

Radio stations established in 1976
CGS